Hachette may refer to:

 Hachette (surname)
 Hachette (publisher), a French publisher, the imprint of Lagardère Publishing
 Hachette Book Group, the American subsidiary
 Hachette Distribution Services, the distribution arm

See also
 Hachette Filipacchi Médias, a French magazine publisher, a subsidiary of Lagardère Media
 Hachette Filipacchi Media U.S., the American subsidiary
 Oxford-Hachette French Dictionary: French–English English–French

eo:Hachette
pl:Hachette